Rachlis is a surname. Notable people with the surname include:

Anita Rachlis, Canadian HIV/AIDS researcher
Kit Rachlis, American journalist and editor